Rothari (or Rothair) ( 606 – 652), of the house of Arodus, was king of the Lombards from 636 to 652; previously he had been duke of Brescia.  He succeeded Arioald, who was an Arian like himself, and was one of the most energetic of Lombard kings. Fredegar  relates (Chronicle, 71) that at the beginning of his reign he put to death many insubordinate nobles, and that in his efforts for peace he maintained very strict discipline.

Life
Rothari was the son of Nanding, and Duke of Brescia. Upon the death of Arioald in 636, he was elected King of the Lombards. He married Arioald's widow, Gundeberga, daughter of King Agilulf and Queen Theodelinda. The Catholic Gundeberga agreed to marry the Arian Rothari because he was tolerant of Catholics. He managed to reinforce the central authority of the king in the face of resistance on the part of the dukes.

Career
Rothari conquered Genoa in 641 and all remaining Eastern Roman territories in the lower valley of the Po, including Oderzo (Opitergium) in 641. Before commencing a campaign the rest of Eastern Roman Liguria in 643, he issued the Edictum Rothari a compilation of Lombard law based on ancient customs. According to Paul the Deacon, "Rothari then captured all the cities of the Romans which were situated upon the shore of the sea from the city of Luna in Tuscany up to the boundaries of the Franks." (IV.xlv)

With these quick conquests, he left the Eastern Roman Empire with only the Ravennan marshes in northern Italy.  The exarch of Ravenna, Plato, tried to regain some territory, but his invading army was defeated by Rothari on the banks of the Scultenna (the Panaro) near Modena, with the loss of 8,000 men, in 645. However, he recaptured Oderzo at same year. Oderzo finally was razed again by Grimoald in 667.

Legacy
Rothari's most lasting act was drawing up the eponymous Edictum Rothari which was the first written codification of Lombard law (it was written in Latin).  He convened a gairethinx to affirm this new and improved collection of old tradition in 642 or 643.  The edict only covered his Lombard men and subjects: Romans continued to live under Roman law in Lombard jurisdictions.

He was succeeded by his son Rodoald. A baptistery in Monte Sant'Angelo is traditionally known as the "Tomb of Rothari", although he was probably buried in the church of San Giovanni Domnarum in Pavia, founded by his wife Gundeberga.

Notes

References
Paul the Deacon, Historia Langobardorum IV.xlii and xlv ( English translation by William Dudley Foulke, 1907)

600s births
652 deaths

Year of birth uncertain

7th-century Lombard monarchs

7th-century Arian Christians
Lombard warriors
Harodingian dynasty